Junonia ansorgei, or Ansorge's leaf butterfly, is a butterfly in the family Nymphalidae. It is found in Cameroon, the eastern part of the Democratic Republic of the Congo, southern Ethiopia, Uganda, western Kenya, western Tanzania and Zambia. It is generally found in dense forests.

References

ansorg
Butterflies of Africa
Butterflies described in 1899
Taxa named by Walter Rothschild